The 2016 Wake Forest Demon Deacons football team represented Wake Forest University during the 2016 NCAA Division I FBS football season.  The team was coached by Dave Clawson, who was in his third season at the school, and played its home games at BB&T Field. Wake Forest competed in the Atlantic Division of the Atlantic Coast Conference, as they have since the league's inception in 1953. They finished the season 7–6, 3–5 in ACC play to finish in a tie for fourth place in the Atlantic Division. They were invited to the Military Bowl where they defeated Temple.

When Wake Forest lost to Louisville on November 12, Dave Clawson alleged that Louisville had received impermissible information that benefited the Cardinals on the football field.  On December 14, 2016, after a month long probe, former Wake Forest staff member and IMG College radio analyst Tommy Elrod was dismissed from the program for leaking confidential and proprietary game preparations on multiple occasions.

Recruiting

Schedule

Coaching staff

Game summaries

Tulane
3rd meeting. 0–2 all time. Last meeting 1995, 35–9 Green Wave in New Orleans.

@ Duke
97th meeting. 37–57–2 all time. Last meeting 2015, 27–21 Blue Devils in Winston–Salem.

Delaware
2nd meeting. 1–0 all time. Last meeting 1932, 7–0 Demon Deacons in Newark.

{{Americanfootballbox
 |titlestyle= ;text-align:center;
 |state=autocollapse
 |title= Week Three: Delaware Fightin' Blue Hens at Wake Forest Demon Deacons – Game summary
 |date=September 17
 |time=6:30 PM EST
 |road=Fightin' Blue Hens |R1=7|R2=7|R3=0|R4=7
 |home=Demon Deacons |H1=10|H2=14|H3=14|H4=0
 |stadium=BB&T Field, Winston-Salem, NC
 |attendance=25,972
 |weather=82° F • N 1 • Clear
 |referee=Jerry Magallanes
 |TV=ESPN3
 |TVAnnouncers= Play-by-Play: Dave Weekley • Color Analyst: Tom O'Brien
 |reference=Final Stats
 |scoring=
First quarter
10:44 WFU – Kendall Hinton 10-yard run (Mike Weaver kick), Demon Deacons 7–0. Drive: 6 plays, 53 yards, TOP 2:452:48 WFU – Mike Weaver 42-yard field goal, Demon Deacons 10–0. Drive 8 plays, 43 yards, TOP 2:550:02 DEL – Diante Cherry 6-yard pass from Blake Rankin (Frank Raggo kick), Demon Deacons 10–7. Drive: 2 plays, 10 yards, TOP 0:51 
Second quarter
11:58 WFU – Tyler Bell 15-yard run (Mike Weaver kick), Demon Deacons 17–7. Drive: 8 plays, 71 yards, TOP 3:046:17 DEL – Thomas Jefferson 10-yard run (Frank Raggo kick), Demon Deacons 17–14. Drive: 4 plays, 19 yards, TOP 1:27 
0:44 WFU – Matt Colburn 1-yard run (Mike Weaver kick), Demon Deacons 24–14. Drive: 14 plays, 75 yards, TOP 5:33	
Third quarter	
11:05 WFU – Alex Bachman 4-yard pass from John Wolford (Mike Weaver kick), Demon Deacons 31–14. Drive: 10 plays, 75 yards, TOP 3:554:45 WFU – John Wolford 7-yard run (Mike Weaver kick), Demon Deacons 38–14. Drive: 8 plays, 70 yards, TOP 4:06Fourth quarter	
8:03 DEL – Jalen Randolph 0-yard fumble recovery (Frank Raggo kick), Demon Deacons 38–21. Drive: 11 plays, 80 yards, TOP 3:53' |stats=
Leading Passers
DEL–Blake Rankin, 6/20, 38 yards, 1 touchdown
WF–John Wolford, 13/24, 155 yards, 1 touchdown, 1 interception
Leading Rushers
DEL–Jalen Randolph, 7 carries, 36 yards, 1 touchdown
WF–Matt Colburn, 24 carries, 118 yards, 1 touchdown
Leading Receivers
DEL–Diante Cherry, 3 receptions, 22 yards, 1 touchdown 
WF–Tabari Hines, 3 receptions, 40 yards 
Leading Tacklers
DEL– John Nassib, 7 tackles 
WF– Marquel Lee, 5 tackles
}}

@ Indiana2nd meeting. 0–1 all time. Last meeting 2015, 31–24 Hoosiers in Winston–Salem.@ NC State110th meeting. 38–65–6 all time. Last meeting 2015, 35–17 Wolfpack in Winston–Salem.Syracuse6th meeting. 1–4 all time. Last meeting 2015, 30–17 Orange in Syracuse.@ Florida State35th meeting. 6–27–1 all time. Last meeting 2015, 24–16 Seminoles in Winston–Salem.Army16th meeting. 11–4 all time. Last meeting 2015, 17–14 Demon Deacons in West Point.Virginia49th meeting. 14–34 all time. Last meeting 2012, 16–10 Demon Deacons in Charlottesville.@ Louisville4th meeting. 0–3 all time. Last meeting 2015, 20–19 Cardinals in Winston–Salem.Clemson82nd meeting. 17–63–1 all time. Last meeting 2015, 33–13 Tigers in Clemson.Boston College24th meeting. 9–12–2 all time. Last meeting 2015, 3–0 Demon Deacons in Chestnut Hill.vs. Temple – Military Bowl2nd meeting. 0–1 all time. Last meeting 1930, 36–0 Owls in Philadelphia.''

Leaks of plays
Colloquially called "WakeyLeaks", some of Wake Forest's opponents appear to have had knowledge of Wake Forest's playbook, even plays they had just created and only practiced for one week.  Suspicion fell on Tommy Elrod, a color commentator on the broadcast crew; Elrod was found to have made long phone calls to the coaches of rival teams in the days before Wake Forest played them, and he had access to the practice tapes compiled by Wake Forest staff.  Elrod had been an assistant coach during the leadership of previous coach Jim Grobe; it is speculated that after Clawson did not hire him on as a coach, instead relegating him to color commentary, he leaked the plays as a form of revenge.  Elrod was fired and banned from the campus in December 2016.

References

Wake Forest
Wake Forest Demon Deacons football seasons
Military Bowl champion seasons
Wake Forest Demon Deacons football